The City Guard is the name of the building which formerly housed the city guard of Osijek, Croatia. It is located in Tvrđa.

Today, the building houses the Archaeological Museum Osijek, a local museum focusing on the history of the city.

History 

The structure was built from 1728 to 1729. It was recently renovated in 2006.

Description 

The building has 2 floors.  Located on Holy Trinity Square, the facade of the City Guard building features a prominent arcade . The building also includes a bell tower with an attached terrace, from the top of which the entirety of Tvrđa is visible. 

The building was renovated in 2006; during the renovation a steel-glass structure was also added, as designed by Branko Silađin.

References 

Buildings and structures in Osijek
Buildings and structures completed in 1729